Aspidoscelis carmenensis, the Carmen Island whiptail, is a species of teiid lizard endemic to Carmen Island in Mexico.

References

carmenensis
Reptiles described in 1986
Taxa named by T. Paul Maslin
Taxa named by Diane Marie Secoy